UPN20 may refer to one of several former UPN network affiliated TV stations that had broadcast on UHF channel 20:

 KIKU in Honolulu, Hawaii (now an independent station)
 KTVD in Denver, Colorado (now affiliated with MyNetworkTV)
 KTXH in Houston, TX (now a MyNetworkTV owned-and-operated station)
 WCCT-TV in Hartford, Connecticut (now affiliated with The CW)
 WDCA in Washington, DC (now a MyNetworkTV owned-and-operated station)